Claremont may refer to:

Places

Australia 
Claremont, Ipswich, a heritage-listed house in Queensland
 Claremont, Tasmania, a suburb of Hobart
 Claremont, Western Australia, a suburb of Perth
 Claremont Football Club, West Australian Football League
 Claremont Oval, home stadium for Claremont Football Club
 Claremont Airbase, aerial firefighting base near Brukunga, South Australia

Canada 
 Claremont, Ontario

Ireland 

 Claremount, County Westmeath

Jamaica 
 Claremont, Jamaica

South Africa 
 Claremont, Cape Town
 Claremont, a suburb in the western side of Pretoria

United Kingdom 
 Claremont (country house), a stately house in Surrey
 Claremont, Salford, Greater Manchester
 Claremont (ward), electoral ward for Claremont, Salford

United States 
 Claremont, California
 Claremont, Oakland/Berkeley, California, a neighborhood in two adjoining cities
 Claremont, Illinois
 Claremont, Minnesota
 Claremont, Mississippi

 Claremont (Port Gibson, Mississippi), a historic house
 Claremont, New Hampshire
 Claremont, North Carolina
 Claremont, South Carolina
 Claremont, South Dakota
 Claremont, Virginia
Claremont, West Virginia

Education 
Claremont Colleges, Claremont, California
 Claremont McKenna College
 Claremont Graduate University
 Claremont School of Theology, Claremont, California
 Claremont Secondary School, Saanich, British Columbia
 Claremont High School (disambiguation)

People
 Claremont (surname)

Other uses 
 Claremont Institute, conservative think tank
 Claremont Review of Books, a quarterly review
 Claremont Hotel & Spa, a resort in California on the Oakland/Berkeley border
 "Claremont", a poem by Samuel Garth

See also 
 Clairemont (disambiguation)
 Clairmont (disambiguation)
 Claremont Airport (disambiguation)
 Claremont High School (disambiguation)
 Claremont Hotel (disambiguation)
 Claremont School (disambiguation)
 Claremont station (disambiguation)
 Clermont (disambiguation)